The 1997 All-Ireland Junior Hurling Championship was the 76th staging of the All-Ireland Junior Championship since its establishment by the Gaelic Athletic Association in 1912.

The All-Ireland final was played on 7 September 1997 at Parnell Park in Dublin, between Monaghan and Meath, in what was their first ever meeting in the final. Monaghan won the match by 3-11 to 0-11 to claim their first ever championship title overall.

Results

All-Ireland Junior Hurling Championship

All-Ireland semi-finals

All-Ireland final

References

Junior
All-Ireland Junior Hurling Championship